Futsal in Catalonia, Spain is managed by the Catalonia Federation of Futsal (FCFS) (Federació Catalana de Futbol Sala), affiliated to European Union of Futsal in 2004 and recognised by the AMF in 2006. 

It's also managed by Catalonia Football Federation (FCF) for the teams that play the FIFA game.

FCFS hierarchical divisional breakdowns
 Divisió d'Honor Nacional Catalana 
 Divisió d'Honor Territorial Catalana 
 2a Divisió FCFS 
 3a Divisió FCFS

FCFS men champions
2004-2005 - C.E. Brasil
2005-2006 - Sant Pau Segúries
2006-2007 - C.E. Brasil
2007-2008 -
2008-2009 -
2009-2010 - CFS LA Garriga

FCFS women champions

2009-2010 - CFS Casa Alcalà

National teams
The Catalonia national futsal teams represent Catalonia in AMF World Cup and UEFS Futsal Championship.

The Catalonia women's national team are the current world champions after winning the 2008 World Cup. They also were the runners-up in the 2004 European Championship.

The Catalonia men's national team has played three times in UEFS European Championships, reaching the second place in 2006, and has played once in AMF Futsal World Cup, in 2007. Also played in the 2007 AMF World Tournament in Yakutia, with the sixth place.

External links
FCFS Catalonia Federation of Futsal
UEFS European Union of Futsal
AMF World Association of Futsal